The Montreal River is a river in Algoma and Sudbury Districts, Ontario, Canada. It is a tributary of Lake Superior.

Course
The river begins at Montreal Lake at the community of Island Lake in northwest Sudbury District. It heads southwest, passes into Algoma District, reaches the  forebay lake above Montreal Falls, and then the settlement and railway station of Montreal Falls themselves on the Algoma Central Railway. It heads west, and passes under Ontario Highway 17 just before reaching its mouth at Lake Superior at the community of Montreal River Harbour.

Hydroelectricity
There are four hydroelectric dams and generating stations on the Montreal River, all owned and operated by Brookfield Renewable Power.

Tributaries
Little Agawa River (right)
Sonny Creek (right)
Jeff Creek (right)
Rabbit Creek (right)
Indian River (right)
Cow River (left)
Keelow Creek (left)
Convey Creek (right)
Tikamaganda River (right)
Challener River (left)
Harvie Creek (right)
Seahorse Creek (right)
Tempest Creek (left)
Puswana Creek (left)
Ebach Creek (left)
Sample Creek (left)
Nawahe Creek (right)
Pemache River (left)

See also
List of rivers of Ontario

References

Sources

Tributaries of Lake Superior
Rivers of Algoma District
Rivers of Sudbury District